Constantino "Tinnex" Galagnara Jaraula (born June 20, 1937) is a Filipino politician who served as Mayor of Cagayan de Oro from 2007 to 2010. He served as representative of Cagayan de Oro's at-large congressional district during the 11th, 12th, and 13th congresses.

During the 11th Congress, Jaraula's first act was filing a resolution seeking to amend the 1987 Constitution through a constitutional convention. In 2003, during the 12th Congress, he was among the many congressmen that endorsed the unconstitutional impeachment complaint against then-Chief Justice Hilario Davide Jr. In the 13th Congress, he served as the chairman of the House Committee on Constitutional Amendments. The committee during his term approved a charter change bill and was passed by the House of Representatives however it was not taken up by the Senate.

Controversy
Jaraula was convicted by the Sandiganbayan alongside Janet Lim-Napoles for graft and corruption in connection with the Priority Development Assistance Fund scandal.

References

Mayors of Cagayan de Oro
Living people
1937 births
Members of the House of Representatives of the Philippines from Cagayan de Oro